Ewan Beaton (born July 13, 1969, in Edmonton, Alberta) is a male judoka from Canada.

He claimed the silver medal in the Men's Bantamweight (– 60 kg) division at the 1991 Pan American Games in Havana, Cuba. In the final he was defeated by Brazil's Shigueto Yamasaki. Four years later he captured the gold medal.

Beaton represented his native country at the 1992 and the 1996 Summer Olympics. He was affiliated with the University of Manitoba.

Coaching career:

1997 to 2000 High Performance Coach Judo Saskatchewan
1999 to 2001 Junior National Coach Judo Canada
2001 to 2001 High Performance Coach Judo Manitoba
2001 to 2008 Coach Coordinator Judo Canada (Team Manager)
2008 to 2015 High Performance Coach Judo Saskatchewan
2004 Olympic Games Canadian Judo Coach
2008 Olympic Games Canadian Judo Team Leader
2015 to Current Alberta Regional Training Center Coach

References
sports-reference

See also
Judo in Manitoba
Judo in Saskatchewan
Judo in Canada

1969 births
Living people
Canadian male judoka
Judoka at the 1992 Summer Olympics
Judoka at the 1996 Summer Olympics
Judoka at the 1991 Pan American Games
Judoka at the 1995 Pan American Games
Olympic judoka of Canada
Sportspeople from Edmonton
University of Manitoba alumni
Pan American Games gold medalists for Canada
Pan American Games silver medalists for Canada
Pan American Games medalists in judo
Medalists at the 1991 Pan American Games
Medalists at the 1995 Pan American Games
20th-century Canadian people